Mourad Gharbi (born 21 January 1966) is a Tunisian footballer. He played in 24 matches for the Tunisia national football team from 1987 to 1994. He was also named in Tunisia's squad for the 1994 African Cup of Nations tournament.

References

1966 births
Living people
Tunisian footballers
Tunisia international footballers
1994 African Cup of Nations players
Place of birth missing (living people)
Association football midfielders